In Australia, a recognised details certificate (identity acknowledgment certificate in South Australia) is a vital record issued by a state or territory's Registry of Births, Marriages, and Deaths, certifying that a person not born in that state or territory has recorded a change of gender with the Registry.

See also 

 Transgender rights in Australia

References

Identity documents of Australia
Vital statistics (government records)